Mount Blackburn (Ahtna: K’ats’i Tl’aadi) is the highest peak in the Wrangell Mountains of Alaska in the United States. It is the fifth-highest peak in the United States and the twelfth-highest peak in North America. The mountain is an old, eroded shield volcano, the second-highest volcano in the U.S. behind Mount Bona and the fifth-highest in North America. It was named in 1885 by Lt. Henry T. Allen of the U.S. Army after Joseph Clay Stiles Blackburn, a U.S. senator from Kentucky. It is located in the heart of Wrangell – St. Elias National Park, the largest national park in the country.

Description
The mountain also contributes a large volume of ice to the north-flowing Nabesna Glacier and the Kuskulana Glacier system.

Mount Blackburn is a large, dramatic peak, with great local relief and independence from higher peaks. While these figures speak to the peak's relief, one measure of its independence is that it is the 50th-most topographically prominent peak in the world.

The western of Blackburn's two summits is the mountain's highest point, a fact that was not understood until the 1960s when new USGS maps were published. The first ascent of the west peak, and hence Mount Blackburn, was done on May 30, 1958, by Bruce Gilbert, Dick Wahlstrom, Hans Gmoser, Adolf Bitterlich, and Leon Blumer via the North (also called the Northwest) Ridge. This team made the first ascent of Blackburn but did not even know it at the time due to the incorrect identification of the highest point. Blumer's article in the 1959 American Alpine Journal is titled "Mount Blackburn – Second Ascent."

Other subfeatures 

Kennedy Peak, or East Blackburn, is the eastern summit and was originally thought to be the highest point. The first ascent of this summit was made in 1912 by Dora Keen and George Handy via the Kennicott Glacier (on the south side of the mountain) and East Face. This heady exploit was ahead of its time. Dora Keen, driven by a deep desire for the climb, solicited miners from the nearby Kennecott Copper Mines, and forged a route up the heavily crevassed East Face to the East Peak, but did not traverse over to the West Peak. Keen went on to write a famous article for the Saturday Evening Post titled, "First up Mount Blackburn." In 1912, Keen and Handy thought they were on Blackburn's highest point.

Geology
Mount Blackburn represents the heavily eroded core of a shield volcano. Because it is shrouded in permanent ice, its internal structure cannot be determined. It is believed to have a summit caldera, greatly modified by glaciation. The oldest rocks in the area are granites, about 4.2 million years old, representing an intrusive mass. The majority of the mountain is 3.4 million year old granite, intruding between andesite flows. From this it is inferred that a caldera collapse took place between 4.2 and 3.4 million years ago, after which activity ceased.

Climbing
Today's standard route on the peak is the 1958 ascent route, the North (or Northwest) Ridge, which is approached from the Nabesna Glacier, on the north side of the mountain, opposite from Keen and Hardy's route. It is a moderate climb by Alaskan standards (Alaska Grade 2).

See also

List of mountain peaks of North America
List of mountain peaks of the United States
List of mountain peaks of Alaska
List of the highest major summits of the United States
List of the most prominent summits of the United States
List of the most isolated major summits of the United States
List of volcanoes in the United States

References and notes

Notes

References

Sources

External links

Landforms of Copper River Census Area, Alaska
Mountains of Alaska
Mountains of Unorganized Borough, Alaska
Mount Blackburn
Shield volcanoes of the United States
Subduction volcanoes
Volcanoes of Alaska
Volcanoes of Unorganized Borough, Alaska
Wrangell–St. Elias National Park and Preserve